United Brotherhood of Carpenters - Local Union 608 is currently affiliated with the N.Y.C. District Council of Carpenters and the United Brotherhood of Carpenters and Joiners of America.  It was granted a charter on January 18, 1918.  Located in New York City, New York, the jurisdiction of the Local covers the western half of Manhattan, Harlem and the Bronx borough. It has approximately 7500 members. Local Union 608 no longer exists.

History
Often referred to as the Irish Local because of the history of Irish Leadership and the majority of the membership is of Irish descent, it has struggled through the years to maintain its independence.  Many of its members have been trained in several areas of Carpentry, including Drywall, Finish Work, Concrete, Scaffolding and others.
Local Union 608 officially disbanded after 92 years, December 14, 2010.

Objective
 To organize and unionize non-union carpenter contractors in the NYC Area.
 To train new apprentices in the craft of Carpentry

Local 17 
After some financial improprieties at Local Union 17 (Bronx), it was merged into Local Union 608 after a brief trusteeship in 1999.  The jurisdiction of the Bronx is often referred to as Local 608 North

Leadership 
From the period of 2009 forward, the local has had several leaders serve as President of the local. Unfortunately, these leaders have been removed by either the General President, or the Federally appointed Review Officer for various reasons. This has demoralized the membership and has prevented the local from moving forward, as their attention is pointed inward, and the membership is splintered into competing factions.

Local 157 
After a period of time during 2009 - 2010, the International United Brotherhood of Carpenters decided to dissolve the local on December 14, 2010, and merge the members into Local Union 157, which currently covers the East Side of Manhattan.  At a future date, another local may be created in Manhattan to take over the jurisdiction of Interior Systems.  This has brought the membership of Local 157 into the 10,000 member range.

Executive leadership
President
 December 7, 2010 - December 14, 2010 (7 days) Tommy McGonnigle
 September 2010 - November 2010 Mike Murphy 
 August 2010 - September 2010 John Daly 
 2010-August 2010 - Joe Firth 
 2009-2010  Martin Devereaux 
 2000-2009       John Greaney 
 1998-2000       Mike Forde
 1994-1998       Patrick J. Harvey
 1980-1994       Paschal McGuinness
 1960-1980       John J O'Connor

Mafia influence 
It has been long reported that the leadership has been under Mafia Influence and it has  been proven on many occasions

References

External links 
 local608.org
 nycdistrictcouncil.com
 carpenters.org

United Brotherhood of Carpenters and Joiners of America